Sniper and Other Love Songs is the second studio album by the American singer/songwriter Harry Chapin, released in 1972. The album's title song is a vaguely fictionalised account of Charles Whitman's shootings from the clocktower of the Main Building of the University of Texas at Austin in August 1966. In 2004 it was released as a double CD package with Heads & Tales featuring several previously unreleased out-takes.

The song "Circle" was a major hit for The New Seekers (released as "Circles") and became known as the Chapin Anthem. "Sunday Morning Sunshine" cracked the Billboard Hot 100. A live version of "A Better Place To Be" charted in 1976.

Track listing

Personnel 

 Harry Chapin - guitar, vocals
 John Wallace - bass, vocals
 Tim Scott - cello
 Ron Palmer - lead guitar, vocals
 Steve Chapin - keyboards
 Russ Kunkel - drums and percussion

Charts

See also

 1972 in music

References

Harry Chapin albums
1972 albums
Elektra Records albums
University of Texas tower shooting